Grandi Navi Veloci (GNV) is an Italian shipping company, based in Genoa, that operates ferries between mainland Italy, Sicily, Sardinia, France, Albania, Morocco and Tunisia. It was established by Aldo Grimaldi in 1992.

History 

GNV was created in 1992 by Aldo Grimaldi, initially as a subsidiary of Grimaldi Group. The first ship of the company, Majestic, entered service in 1993 on the Genoa-Palermo route, followed in 1994 by the sistership Splendid on the Genoa-Porto Torres route. Majestic and Splendid were the first cruiseferries ever operated by an Italian company.

The fleet was enlarged with new cruise ferries through the 1990s, and in 2000 the company went public. New routes were added, including Livorno-Palermo, Genoa-Olbia and Genoa-Barcelona. In 2002 and 2003 the new, large cruise ferries La Superba and La Suprema entered service. Lines for Tunisia, as well a new Civitavecchia-Palermo line, were opened.

In 2008 the fleet was enlarged with three ro-ro cargo ships, Audacia, Tenacia, and Coraggio, and a new Genoa-Barcelona-Tangier line was opened. In 2009, GNV became fully independent from the Grimaldi family and Grimaldi Group. In 2010 the company was acquired by the MSC Group; in the same year, GNV merged with SNAV, also a subsidiary of MSC.
In 2012, following the ceasing of the services by Comarit and Comanav, GNV opened new lines between Sète, Tangier and Nador. In 2015, GNV opened a new line between Italy and Albania.

The company, currently operates a fleet of thirteen cruise ferries, including some of the largest ferries in Europe. Its CEO is Matteo Catani.

Coronavirus pandemic 

Grandi Navi Veloci converted one of their ferries, into a hospital ship in order to treat coronavirus patients.  The ship was delivered to Liguria, Italy, on 23 March 2020, and was made available for the symbolic cost of 1 EUR.  With help from Registro Italiano Navale and a number of local and national companies, many of which donated their time, materials, and expertise, Splendid was converted into a hospital ship in roughly 10 days.  Docked at Genoa's Ponte Colombo, the hospital ship is currently treating only coronavirus patients without serious pathologies, such as patients recovering after having been previously intubated.

Current fleet 

La Superba (49,270 GT, built 2002)
La Suprema (49,270 GT, built 2003)
Excelsior (39,739 GT, built 1998)
Excellent (39,739 GT, built 1998)
Fantastic (35,186 GT, built 1996)
Splendid (39,139 GT, built 1994)
Majestic (32,777 GT, built 1993)
GNV Atlas (33,336 GT, built 1990)
GNV Cristal (33,336 GT, built 1989)
Rhapsody (44,307 GT, built 1996)
GNV Azzurra (29,706 GT, built 1981)
GNV Allegra (31,914 GT, built 1987)
SNAV Adriatico (31,190 GT, built in 1986; rent until 2021)
GNV Aries (31,785, build in 1987)
GNV Antares  (31,598, build 1987)
GNV Spirit (32,728 GT, built 2001)
 Golden Bridge (26,463 GT, built 1990)(Chartered)

Accidents and incidents 
 On 31 October 2018, a 8:00am local time, the Excellent crashed into the Port of Barcelona (ESBCN) after a gust of wind drove it into the cargo pier, smashing into a gantry crane, which tipped over onto containers holding flammable chemicals, which caught fire, causing toxic smoke, and setting the pier ablaze. The Excellent had been trying to dock, but was prevented from doing so due to bad weather.

References

External links 
 Company website

Shipping companies of Italy
Transport companies established in 1992
Ferry companies of Italy
Companies based in Genoa